ŽRK Vardar is a Macedonian women's handball club from Skopje, North Macedonia. The team currently competes in the Macedonian women's First League of Handball, Women's Regional Handball League and used to be a top competitor in the Women's EHF Champions League.

History
 
The Beginning 
WHC Vardar was founded in 1961, as part of the Vardar Sports Club in Skopje, which had been founded in 1947.

WHC Grafichar Skopje club was established in 1948, and it was the top quality team at the time. They won many titles including the last one in 1960 before the fusion. In 1961 Grafichar renamed itself to Vardar and almost the entire team of the club Grafichar joined the team. WHC Vardar started with winning the championship in 1961. The next few seasons they played in a higher rank including playoffs for the Federal First Division. In 1963 after the earthquake, the Vardar team was dismissed and they didn't compete for many seasons until 1970. Most of the players joined HC Rabotnicki and Metalurg Skopje. 
New Come Back
In the year 1970 after the financial situation got better they started to compete in Macedonian league again. They won 4 championships in a row from 1971 until 1974 and played qualification for the higher rank Federal Division. They didn't manage to get to higher rank losing tight barrage games with 1 or 2 goals difference in aggregate. In 1976 and 1977 they won the Macedonian championship again and next year they qualified for the second Division Federal League. They won the Second Division in 1978 and reached the play-offs for top flight federal division, but lost in aggregate 1 goal difference. In the next years they got back in the Macedonian league again. They won the title in 1983 .They played in the Macedonian league until 1992. After 1992 Macedonian league became the top flight league where they had tough competition in newly rising club Kometal GP Skopje. 
First league days   
Until Kometal Gjorče Petrov officially stopped working, Vardar was the only other club to win any title in any of the competitions in Macedonia by winning the 1994 Macedonian Cup. In the 2012/2013 season with the arrival of the new sponsor and sporting director Sergey Samsonenko along with some new players, the team started to achieve more positive results and won its first league title. 
Stardom Days
Vardar got back on the champions track in the beginning of 2011 when their financial situation became great again. They brought many new top class players and started making champions team. With all those new super star players coming each year, Vardar started winning many championships and cups plus Regional League. They played with great success in the Women's Champions league beating the best clubs in the world and bringing Glory to Skopje fans. In the year 2012 the new Sports center Jane Sandanski was built which became handball temple of Glory .
Since 2013, the team had three 3rd-place finishes in the EHF Champions League and two 2nd-place finishes in the seasons 2016–17 and 2017–18 being the only team that competed in the all EHF Final Four Tournaments.
Recent rank
Earlier in 2018 the president of the club, Gordana Naceva, announced the breakup of the team made up from world class players and added that they will focus on young players. In the season 2019 and 2020 Vardar finished 3 rd in the Macedonian league. They didn't play in the Champions league any more after they've decided that their team is not strong enough for the competition.

Kits

Accomplishments

Domestic competitions 
Macedonian First League:
 Winners (6): 2012–13, 2013–14, 2014–15, 2015–16, 2016–17, 2017–18

Macedonian Cup
 Winners (6): 1994, 2014, 2015, 2016, 2017, 2018

European competitions 
EHF Champions League:
  Runner-up: 2016–17, 2017–18
 Third placed: 2013–14, 2014–15, 2015–16

Other competitions
Women's Regional Handball League:
 Winners: 2016–17, 2017–18
 Runner-up: 2013–14

Bucharest Trophy:
 Third placed: 2015

Vardar Trophy:
 Winners: 2015
 Runner-up: 2017

Arena information
Unlike the usual situation in handball of clubs renting halls from municipalities or private owners, HC Vardar itself is the owner of the Jane Sandanski Arena where they play all their home matches in the Women's EHF Champions League, the Women's Regional Handball League and in the domestic competitions.

Team

Current squad of the first team

Current squad
Squad for the 2021–22 season

Staff

Professional staff

Management

Former club members

Notable former players

  Julija Nikolić
  Marija Shteriova
  Dragana Pecevska
  Biljana Crvenkoska
  Andrea Beleska
  Ivana Sazdovski
  Robertina Mečevska
  Dragana Petkovska
  Sara Ristovska
  Mirjeta Bajramoska
  Teodora Keramičieva
  Ivana Gakidova
  Simona Stojanovska
  Sara Mitova
  Jovana Micevska
  Leonida Gičevska
  Jovana Sazdovska
  Inna Suslina
  Polina Kuznetsova
  Tatiana Khmyrova
  Olga Chernoivanenko
  Nigina Saidova
  Ekaterina Kostyukova
  Alena Ikhneva
  Andrea Lekić
  Dragana Cvijić
  Marija Petrović
  Sanja Damnjanović
  Marija Lojpur
  Marina Dmitrović
  Andrea Klikovac
  Jovanka Radičević 
  Ana Đokić
  Itana Grbić
  Allison Pineau
  Siraba Dembélé
  Amandine Leynaud
  Alexandra Lacrabère
  Andrea Penezić
  Andrea Čanađija
  Maja Sokač
  Barbara Lazović
  Tamara Mavsar
  Dayane Pires da Rocha
  Mayssa Pessoa
  Begoña Fernández
  Dziyana Ilyina
  Anja Althaus
  Camilla Herrem

Notable former  coaches
  Indira Kastratović (2012–2015)
  Ace Stankovski
  Sime Simovski
  Jan Pytlick (2015–2016)
  Kim Rasmussen (2015)
  David Davis (2016–2017)
  Roberto García Parrondo (2018–2019)
  Eduard Koksharov (2016)
  Irina Dibirova

Kit manufacturers
 Hummel International

European competitions record

EHF Champions League
{| class="wikitable" style="text-align: left"
! Season
! Round
! Club
! Home
! Away
! Aggregate
|-
| colspan="6" bgcolor=white|
|-
|rowspan=10 bgcolor=FFDAB9|2013–14
| align=center| Q2-SF
| Jomi Salerno
| align=center colspan=3|35–16
|-
| align=center| Q2-F
| Fleury Loiret Handball
| align=center colspan=3|33–25
|-
| align=center rowspan=3| GM(Group D)
| Larvik
|align=center|27–27
|align=center|31–29
| align=center rowspan=3| 1st
|-
| Balonmano Bera Bera
|align=center|30–20
|align=center|23–19
|-
| RK Podravka Koprivnica
|align=center|39–26
|align=center|35–17
|-
| align=center rowspan=3| MR(Group 1)
| FC Midtjylland
|align=center|24–23
|align=center|24–25
| align=center rowspan=3| 1st
|-
| Thüringer HC
|align=center|31–25
|align=center|24–24
|-
| IK Sävehof
|align=center|24–18
|align=center|27–27
|-
| align=center| SF (F4)
| Budućnost
| align=center colspan=3|20–22
|-
| align=center| 3rd (F4)
| FC Midtjylland
| align=center colspan=3|34–31
|-
|colspan=7 style="text-align: center;" bgcolor=white|
|-
|rowspan=9 bgcolor=FFDAB9|2014–15
| align=center rowspan=3| GM(Group C)
| Budućnost
|align=center|24–24
|align=center|17–23
| align=center rowspan=3| 2nd
|-
| Podravka Koprivnica
|align=center|35–25
|align=center|27–26
|-
| Thüringer HC
|align=center|26–21
|align=center|20–21
|-
| align=center rowspan=3| MR(Group 1)
| Dinamo-Sinara
|align=center|28–27
|align=center|25–33
| align=center rowspan=3| 2nd
|-
| HC Leipzig
|align=center|26–20
|align=center|23–26
|-
| RK Krim
|align=center|41–30
|align=center|47–29
|-
| align=center| QF
| Győri ETO KC
|align=center|24–18
|align=center|27–27
| align=center|51–45
|-
| align=center| SF (F4)
| Budućnost
| align=center colspan=3|17–27
|-
| align=center| 3rd (F4)
| Dinamo-Sinara
| align=center colspan=3|28–26
|-
|colspan=7 style="text-align: center;" bgcolor=white|
|-
|rowspan=9 bgcolor=FFDAB9|2015–16
| align=center rowspan=3| GM(Group C)
| FC Midtjylland
|align=center|33–24
|align=center|25−15
| align=center rowspan=3| 2nd
|-
| Hypo Niederösterreich
|align=center|37−25
|align=center|38–25
|-
| Győri ETO KC
|align=center|22–27
|align=center|27−28
|-
| align=center rowspan=3| MR(Group 2)
| CSM Bucharest
|align=center|22−21
|align=center|30−25
| align=center rowspan=3| 3rd
|-
| Budućnost
|align=center|26−24
|align=center|19−31
|-
| IK Sävehof
|align=center|37−25
|align=center|29−26
|-
| align=center| QF
| Larvik
|align=center|34–20
|align=center|26–28
| align=center|60–48
|-
| align=center| SF (F4)
| CSM Bucharest
| align=center colspan=3|21–27
|-
| align=center| 3rd (F4)
| Budućnost
| align=center colspan=3|30–28
|-
|colspan=7 style="text-align: center;" bgcolor=white|
|-
|rowspan=9 bgcolor=silver|2016–17
| align=center rowspan=3| GM(Group B)| Ferencvárosi TC
|align=center|27–27
|align=center|37–24
| align=center rowspan=3| 1st
|-
| HC Astrakhanochka
|align=center|39–25
|align=center|31–26
|-
| HC Leipzig
|align=center|41–24
|align=center|45–22
|-
| align=center rowspan=3| MR(Group 1)
| Metz
|align=center|23−21
|align=center|28−42
| align=center rowspan=3| 1st
|-
| Budućnost
|align=center|28−31
|align=center|31−28
|-
| Thüringer HC
|align=center|36−26
|align=center|31−29
|-
| align=center| QF
| FC Midtjylland
|align=center|26–24
|align=center|28–26
| align=center|54–50
|-
| align=center| SF (F4)
| CSM Bucharest
| align=center colspan=3|38–33
|-
| align=center| F (F4)
| Győri ETO KC
| align=center colspan=3|30–31 (ET)
|-
|colspan=7 style="text-align: center;" bgcolor=white|
|-
|rowspan=10 bgcolor=silver |2017–18
| align=center rowspan=3| GM(Group C)
| Ferencvárosi TC
|align=center|34–31
|align=center|29–28
| align=center rowspan=3| 1st
|-
| Larvik
|align=center|30–27
|align=center|31–19
|-
| Thüringer HC
|align=center|29–21
|align=center|29–21
|-
| align=center rowspan=3| MR(Group 2)
| Metz
|align=center|29−23
|align=center|22−24
| align=center rowspan=3| 1st
|-
| SG BBM Bietigheim
|align=center|30−22
|align=center|38−26
|-
| Budućnost
|align=center|31−24
|align=center|30−25
|-
| align=center| QF
| FC Midtjylland
|align=center|32–25
|align=center|24–23
| align=center|56–48
|-
| align=center| SF (F4)
| Rostov-Don
| align=center colspan=3|25–19
|-
| align=center| F (F4)
| Győri ETO KC
| align=center colspan=3|26–27 (ET)
|}

EHF Cup

Challenge Cup

Regional Handball League

European competitions record (WHC Vardar SCJS)
EHF Cup

Challenge Cup

Statistics

All–time Top 10 Scorers in the EHF Champions LeagueAs of 2017–18 seasonMost appearances in the EHF Champions LeagueAs of 2017–18 season''

Individual awards in the EHF Champions League

References

External links

Handball clubs in North Macedonia
Handball clubs established in 1961
Sport in Skopje